Maksim Shevchenko may refer to:
 Maksim Aleksandrovich Shevchenko (b. 1983), Russian footballer
 Maksim Igorevich Shevchenko (b. 1980), Kazakhstani footballer
 Maksim Leonardovich Shevchenko (b. 1966), Russian journalist and presenter of Channel One